Jerzy Andrzej Potz (February 1, 1953 – January 27, 2000) was a Polish ice hockey player. He played for the Poland men's national ice hockey team at the 1972 Winter Olympics in Sapporo, the 1976 Winter Olympics in Innsbruck, the 1980 Winter Olympics in Lake Placid, and the 1988 Winter Olympics in Calgary.

He also represented his country at the IIHF World Championships eleven times. In total, he played 189 games for the Polish national team.

He played in Poland for ŁKS Łódź from 1971–1982, before joining the German club, the Frankfurt Lions. He played for Frankfurt until 1988, when he joined Rote Teufel Bad Nauheim. He would play one year for the club before retiring in 1990.

References

External links

1953 births
2000 deaths
Ice hockey players at the 1972 Winter Olympics
Ice hockey players at the 1976 Winter Olympics
Ice hockey players at the 1980 Winter Olympics
Ice hockey players at the 1988 Winter Olympics
Olympic ice hockey players of Poland
Polish ice hockey defencemen
Sportspeople from Łódź
Frankfurt Lions players